Thespieus is a genus of skipper butterflies in the family Hesperiidae.

Species
Thespieus abatira (J. Zikán, 1938)
Thespieus abauna (J. Zikán, 1938)
Thespieus argentina Draudt, 1923
Thespieus aspernatus Draudt, 1923
Thespieus caraca Evans, 1955
Thespieus castor Hayward, 1948
Thespieus catochra (Plötz, 1882)
Thespieus dalman (Latreille, [1824])
Thespieus duidensis Bell, 1932
Thespieus ethemides (Burmeister, 1878)
Thespieus fassli (Draudt, 1923)
Thespieus fulvangula (Weymer, 1890)
Thespieus haywardi Evans, 1937
Thespieus hieroglyphica Draudt, 1923
Thespieus himella (Hewitson, 1868)
Thespieus homochromus Mielke, 1978
Thespieus inez Nicolay, 1973
Thespieus jora Evans, 1955
Thespieus lutetia (Hewitson, [1866])
Thespieus macareus (Herrich-Schäffer, 1869)
Thespieus matucanae Lindsey, 1925
Thespieus opigena (Hewitson, 1866)
Thespieus othna (Butler, 1870)
Thespieus peruviae Lindsey, 1925
Thespieus pinda Evans, 1955
Thespieus tapayuna (J. Zikán, 1938)
Thespieus thona Evans, 1955
Thespieus tihoneta (Weeks, 1901)
Thespieus vividus (Mabille, 1891)
Thespieus xarina Hayward, 1948
Thespieus xarippe (Butler, 1870)
Thespieus zikani Mielke, 1971

References

 , 1932: Hesperiidae (Lepidoptera, Rhopalocera) of the Roraima and Duida expeditions, with descriptions of new species. American Museum Novitates 555: 1-16. Full article: .
 , 1938: A new genus and five new species of Neotropical Hesperiidae (Lepidoptera: Rhopalocera). American Museum Novitates 1013: 1-11. Full article: .
 , 1942: New genera and new species of neotropical Hesperiidae (Lepidoptera, Rhopalocera). American Museum Novitates 1205: 1-9. Full article: .
 , 2004; Atlas of Neotropical Lepidoptera; Checklist: Part 4A; Hesperioidea - Papilionoidea.
 , 1973: Descriptions of new neotropical Hesperiidae. Journal of the Lepidopterists' Society 27 (4): 243-257. Full article: .

External links
Natural History Museum Lepidoptera genus database

Hesperiini
Hesperiidae genera
Taxa named by Frederick DuCane Godman